The Eyo Festival, otherwise known as the Adamu Orisha Play, is a Yoruba festival unique to Lagos, Nigeria. In modern times, it is presented by the people of Lagos as a tourist event and due to its history, is traditionally performed on Lagos Island.

Eyo
The word "Eyo" also refers to the costumed dancers, known as the masquerades that come out during the festival. The origins of this observance are found in the inner workings of the secret societies of Lagos. Back in the day, the Eyo festival was held to escort the soul of a departed Lagos King or Chief and to usher in a new king. It is widely believed that the play is one of the manifestations of the customary African revelry that serves as the forerunner of the modern carnival in Brazil. On Eyo Day, the main highway in the heart of the city (from the end of Carter Bridge to Tinubu Square) is closed to traffic, allowing for procession from Idumota to the Iga Idunganran palace.  The white-clad Eyo masquerades represent the spirits of the dead, and are referred to in Yoruba as "agogoro Eyo" (literally: "tall Eyo").

The first procession in Lagos was on the 20th of February, 1854, to commemorate the life of the Oba Akintoye. Eyos (the masquerades) celebrate a Oba´s (king) life. Eyo Festival  is a homage to his death. The ritual is also organized to commemorate the election of a new leader. Traditionally, it only occurs at these times. Nowadays, and because it is such a traditional festival, it can be celebrated for the death of a notable person, or to celebrate a special occasion such as visits by heads of state.

Here, the participants all pay homage to the reigning Oba of Lagos. The festival takes place whenever occasion and tradition demand, though it is usually held as part of the final burial rites of a highly regarded chief in the king's court.

Among the Yorubas, the indigenous religions have largely lost the greater majority of their traditional followers to Christianity and Islam. Be that as it may, the old festivals are still almost universally observed as tourist attractions which generate large amounts of revenue for government and small business around the Lagos Island venue of the Eyo festival. It is during these occasions that their traditional monarchs and nobles exercise the most of their residual power.

Order of events
In his book Nigerian Festivals, travel writer and culture reporter Pelu Awofeso notes: A full week before the festival (always a Sunday), the ‘senior’ eyo group, the Adimu (identified by a black, broad-rimmed hat), goes public with a staff. When this happens, it means the event will take place on the following Saturday. Each of the four other Eyo groups — Laba (Red), Oniko (yellow), Ologede (Green) and Agere (Purple) — take their turns in that order from Monday to Thursday.

History 
Historically, Iperu is the source, cradle and originator of Eyo in Nigeria and the world. There are 5 different branches/types of Iga Eyo in Iperu Akesan

Names of the families and Iga of Eyo each represents are:

 Iga Pakerike which is symbolized by red cap of éyo
 Iga Agbonmagbe, also symbolized by blue cap of éyo.
 Iga éyo Odoru
 Iga éyo Mogusen/Amororoo
 Iga éyo Fibigbuwa

The major source of éyo in Iperu is the Iga éyo Pakeriké and other 4 are the Iperu Royal houses.History made us to understand that Eyó was brought to Lagos to entertain an in-law which has now become something more celebrated in Lagos today.

Akesan aagbé wa! Remo asuwon ooo!

Festival dates

2000
2000, Commemorating Justice G.B.A. Coker, a Lagos high chief, the Olori Adimu and the Olori Eyo of the Adimu Eyo cultural masquerade .

2011
November 26, commemorating Prince Yesufu Abiodun Oniru, a Lagos nobleman.

2017
May 20, commemorating the 50th anniversary of Lagos state tagged Lagos@50 and also to commemorate the life and times of the late Oba of Ikate Kingdom Oba Yekini Adeniyi Elegushi Kunsela 11.

Prohibited items
Here is a list of prohibited items at the festival:

 Okada motorcycle taxis
 bicycles
 sandals
 Suku - hairstyle that is popular among the Yorubas, one that has the hair converge at the middle, then shoot upward, before tipping downward.
 smoking
 female with head tie or headgear or any covering of the head
 male with cap of any kind
 wearing of the Eyo costume overnight or to cross a river or lagoon.

The masquerades are known to beat people who use any of the prohibited items at sight with their staffs.

Gallery

See also

Festivals in Nigeria

References 

Cultural festivals in Lagos
Annual events in Lagos
Lagos Island
Yoruba festivals
Parades in Lagos